Diego Della Valle (born 30 December 1953) is the chairman of the Italian leather goods company Tod's.

Biography

Family, youth and studies 
Diego Della Valle is the elder son of Dorino Della Valle and grandson of Filippo Della Valle. Filippo started his shoemaking business in the 1920s, which Diego expanded into the now famous Tod's brand.

In his younger days, Diego studied Law in the University of Bologna having got that academic degree in 1975, conciliating since 2000 the career and the marketing of the family's shoemaking business.

Even during his younger days, Diego was business savvy: Diego used the power of celebrity to popularise his product, such an example was to have once persuaded his friend Luca di Montezemolo, who was a protégé of the then Fiat boss Gianni Agnelli, to present Agnelli with a pair of Tod's driving moccasins – the lawyer got Agnelli to wear Tod's shoes when attending Juventus football matches, which were widely televised; this product placement prompted a spike in sales.

Later 
Diego now manages Tod's with his brother Andrea. Diego's older son, Emanuele, is also involved with the family business as the creative director. The factory in Casette d'Ete was designed by his wife, Barbara.

Other interests 
Diego sits on the board of a number of companies, such as Ferrari, Maserati, Banca Nazionale del Lavoro and LVMH.

Sporting diligence 
Diego bought the Tuscan football club ACF Fiorentina in 2002 owning it since that year, and owns the fashion brand Maison Schiaparelli which he is reviving. He sold ACF Fiorentina to Rocco Commisso at the end of the 2018/2019 season.

Historical culture 
In 2013, he announced that he will take the restoration of the Colosseum, of Rome – by the costs of more than €30 mi.

Diego vs. Silvio Berlusconi 
Diego has publicly attacked Silvio Berlusconi for the over-taxing of big business and his failure to support smaller Italian businesses. In return, Berlusconi has talked of suing Diego for defamation.

References

University of Bologna alumni
20th-century Italian lawyers
Italian expatriates in the United States
1953 births
Italian chief executives
Directors of LVMH
Living people
People involved in the 2006 Italian football scandal
Italian industrialists
Italian billionaires
20th-century Italian businesspeople
21st-century Italian businesspeople
Italian football chairmen and investors
Italian investors
ACF Fiorentina chairmen and investors
Della Valle family
People from Sant'Elpidio a Mare